Eilema griveaudi is a moth of the subfamily Arctiinae. It was described by Hervé de Toulgoët in 1960. It is found in eastern Madagascar.

This species has a wingspan of 33 mm. The forewings are red orange with a large blue-black-metallic spot. The holotype was provided from Moramanga.

References

griveaudi
Moths described in 1960